The 2017 All-Ireland Senior Ladies' Football Championship was the 44th edition of the Ladies' Gaelic Football Association's premier inter-county Ladies' Gaelic Football tournament. It is known for sponsorship reasons as the TG4 All-Ireland Senior Ladies' Football Championship.

As well as live games on TG4, this season was the first to see live-streaming of championship games via YouTube.

Format

Provincial Championships

Connacht, Leinster, Munster and Ulster each organise their provincial championship. Each province determines the format for deciding their champions and it may be league, group, knock-out, double-elimination, etc. or a combination. For clarity, the format is explained in the provincial sections below.

Qualifiers

All teams except the provincial champions enter the All-Ireland qualifiers. The final four winners from the qualifiers re-enter the All-Ireland championship at the quarter-final stage. All matches are knock-out.

All-Ireland

The four provincial champions play the four winners from the qualifiers in the All-Ireland quarter-finals with the winners progressing to the semi-finals. The final is normally played on the fourth Sunday in September. All matches are knock-out.

Hawkeye

This was the first year that Hawkeye was used in Ladies Gaelic Football but was limited to televised matches.

Provincial championships

Connacht Championship

Connacht Format

As only two teams enter, a knock-out final is played.

Connacht Final

Leinster Championship

Leinster Format

Three of the four Leinster teams (Kildare, Laois and Westmeath) compete in an initial group stage. Each team plays all the other teams once in three rounds.

The group winner advances to the final. The group runner-up plays Dublin in the semi-final.

Leinster Group Stage

Leinster Semi-Final

Leinster Final

Munster Championship

Munster Format

The three Munster teams (Cork, Kerry and Waterford) compete in an initial group stage. The top two teams advance to the final.

Munster Group Stage

Munster Final

Ulster Championship

Ulster Format

Four teams compete in two semi-finals and a final. All matches are knockout.

Ulster Semi-Finals

Ulster Final

Qualifiers

Qualifiers Format

All the teams except the provincial champions enter the qualifiers. All matches are knock-out.

A preliminary round is held to reduce the number of teams to eight who then play four matches. The four winners play the four provincial champions in the All-Ireland quarter-finals.

Qualifiers Preliminary Round

Qualifiers Last Eight

All-Ireland

All-Ireland Quarter-Finals

The four provincial champions play the four remaining teams from the qualifiers.

All-Ireland Semi-Finals

All-Ireland final

References